Hydrogenophaga laconesensis is a Gram-negative, non-spore-forming and motile bacterium from the genus of Hydrogenophaga which has been isolated from well water.

References

Comamonadaceae
Bacteria described in 2017